Fructilactobacillus sanfranciscensis is a heterofermentative species of lactic acid bacteria which, through the production mainly of lactic and acetic acids, helps give sourdough bread its characteristic taste. It is named after San Francisco, where sourdough was found to contain the variety, though it is dominant in Type I sourdoughs globally. In fact, F. sanfranciscensis has been used in sourdough breads for thousands of years, and is used in 3 million tons of sourdough goods yearly.

Sourdough starters are leavened by a mixture of yeast and lactobacilli in a ratio of about 1:100. The yeast is most commonly Kasachstania humilis (formerly Candida humilis or C. milleri). This yeast cannot metabolize the maltose found in the dough, while the Fructilactobacillus requires maltose. They therefore act without conflict for substrate, with lactobacilli utilizing maltose and the yeast utilizing the other sugars, including the glucose produced by the F. sanfranciscensis.

External conditions such as acidity and temperature affect the growth rates of F. sanfranciscensis. A temperature of 33 °C (91 °F) leads to maximum growth rates, whereas temperatures over 41 °C (105 °F) completely inhibit the bacteria growth. Ideal and maximum growth temperatures of other organisms may be quite different; for instance a common yeast in sourdough, K. humilis prefers 27 °C (81 °F) and will not grow above 36 °C (97 °F).

For commercial use, specific strains of F sanfranciscensis are grown on defined media, freeze-dried, and shipped to bakeries worldwide.

References

External links
Type strain of Lactobacillus sanfranciscensis at BacDive -  the Bacterial Diversity Metadatabase

History of San Francisco
Lactobacillaceae
Bacteria described in 1971
Cuisine of the San Francisco Bay Area